The Portuguese Labour Party (PTP) is a Portuguese centre-left political party currently led by Amândio Madaleno. It was recognized by the Portuguese Constitutional Court on 1 July 2009. 

It had 3 seats in the Legislative Assembly of Madeira from 2011 to 2015. In the 2015 Madeiran regional election, the party ran on an electoral list with the Socialist Party, the People–Animals–Nature and the Earth Party, in an alliance named Mudança (Change), which elected one PTP deputy.

References

2009 establishments in Portugal
Political parties established in 2009
Political parties in Portugal
Pro-European political parties in Portugal
Social democratic parties in Europe
Socialist parties in Portugal
Centre-left parties in Europe